Aamer Ishaq (born 30 October 1971) is a Pakistani former cricketer. He played first-class and List A matches for Pakistan National Shipping Corporation and Islamabad between 1988 and 1996.

References

External links
 

1971 births
Living people
Pakistani cricketers
Pakistan National Shipping Corporation cricketers
Islamabad cricketers
Cricketers from Karachi